HRR may refer to:

 Haploid-relative-risk, a method for determining gene allele association to a disease
 Hardy, Rand & Rittler pseudoisochromatic plates, a type of color vision test 
 Harrington railway station, in England
 Henley Royal Regatta
 Healy River Airport, in Alaska, United States
 Heart rate reserve 
 Hirzebruch–Riemann–Roch theorem
 Historicorum Romanorum reliquiae, a collection of ancient fragmentary Latin history-works
 The History of Rock and Roll, a radio documentary
 Holy Roman Empire
 Homologous recombination repair, a major DNA repair pathway that mainly acts on double-strand breaks and interstrand crosslinks
 Hondo Railway, an American railway
 Horuru language, spoken in Indonesia